Live...In the Raw is the first live album by W.A.S.P. (fourth album overall), released in 1987. This album can be seen as something of a breakwater between the 'old' W.A.S.P. of the first three albums and the more mature sound of the releases that would follow. It is also the album to feature "Harder Faster", which is about the PMRC declaring them "sexual perverts".

"The Manimal" and "Harder Faster" were written specifically for this album and the studio song "Scream Until You Like It" was recorded for the movie Ghoulies II. The acoustic version of "Sleeping (In the Fire)" is also a studio recording.

This would be the final release to feature drummer Steve Riley, who would leave the band shortly after the conclusion of the tour to join L.A. Guns.

Track listing
All songs written by Blackie Lawless unless otherwise noted.
Side one
"Inside the Electric Circus" – 4:32
"I Don't Need No Doctor" (Jo Armstead, Nick Ashford, Valerie Simpson) – 3:35
"L.O.V.E. Machine" – 4:31
"Wild Child" (Lawless, Chris Holmes) – 6:02
"9.5.-N.A.S.T.Y." (Lawless, Holmes) – 5:11
"Sleeping (In the Fire)" – 5:23
Side two
"The Manimal" (Lawless, Holmes)  – 4:43
"I Wanna Be Somebody" – 6:43
"Harder Faster" – 7:19
"Blind in Texas" – 5:40
"Scream Until You Like It (Theme from Ghoulies II)" (Paul Sabu, Charles Esposito, Neil Citron) – 3:26 (studio recording)

1998 CD reissue bonus tracks
"Shoot from the Hip" – 5:16
"Widowmaker" – 4:35
"Sex Drive" (Lawless, Holmes) – 3:41
"Sleeping (In the Fire)" (Acoustic) – 4:02

Personnel
W.A.S.P.
Blackie Lawless – vocals and lead guitar, producer
Chris Holmes – lead and rhythm guitar
Johnny Rod – bass, backing vocals
Steve Riley – drums, backing vocals

Production
Duane Baron – engineer and mixing
Richard McKernan – additional engineering
John Purdell – technical assistance
George Marino – mastering at Sterling Sound, New York

Charts

Album

Singles

References

1987 live albums
W.A.S.P. albums
Albums produced by Blackie Lawless
Capitol Records live albums